Cornell Tudin (September 21, 1917 – October 24, 1988) was a Canadian professional ice hockey forward who played 4 games in the National Hockey League for the Montreal Canadiens. He was born in Ottawa, Ontario.

External links

1917 births
1988 deaths
Canadian expatriates in the United States
Canadian ice hockey forwards
Ice hockey people from Ottawa
Montreal Canadiens players
New Haven Eagles players
Washington Lions players